Lameroo may refer to:
 Lameroo, South Australia, a town in the Murray Mallee region of South Australia
 Lameroo Hawks football team
 District Council of Lameroo former local government area

 Lameroo Beach in the Northern Territory of Australia